Meeku Maathrame Cheptha is a 2019 Indian Telugu-language comedy drama film written and directed by Shammeer Sultan, and produced by Vardhan Deverakonda and Vijay Deverakonda under the banner King of the Hill Entertainment. The film features  Tharun Bhascker and Abhinav Gomatam in lead roles while Anasuya Bharadwaj, Vani Bhojan, and Avantika Mishra play supporting roles. The film marks the debut of Sultan as director and Deverakonda as producer, who also makes a cameo appearance.

Plot 

It revolves around a man who lies to his fiancée and then his friends help him cover up the lies, which leads to humorous situations.

Cast 
 Tharun Bhascker as Rakesh, a VJ working at a TV channel
 Abhinav Gomatam as Kamesh, Rakesh's best friend
 Anasuya Bharadwaj as Samyuktha, Rakesh's friend's sister	
 Vani Bhojan as Stephie, Rakesh's love interest
 Naveen George Thomas as Rakesh's friend
 Avantika Mishra as Rakesh's co-star 
 Pavani Gangireddy as Jacqueline
 Vijay Devarakonda as himself, a cameo appearance

Soundtrack 

The soundtrack is composed by Sivakumar and lyrics by Rakendu Mouli.
Shammeer Sultan and AsurA.

Reception 
Suresh Kavirayani of Deccan Chronicle rated the film 3 stars of 5, and praised the performances of the cast. "Tharun Bhascker steals the acting honours [...] Abhinav Gomatam does a fantastic job and is on par with Tharun Bhascker". The Hindu critic Y. Sunitha Cowdhary opined that though the film had situational humour and interesting dialogues, it is only entertaining in parts. 

A reviewer from News18 India called the film, "Smartest Black Comedy of the Year". The reviewer rated the film 3.5/5 and stated: "There is a sneakingly sinuous feel of a Guy Ritchie crime thriller in this Telugu gamechanger of a film. Except that Ritchie's characters are more laconic."

References

External links 
 

2010s Telugu-language films
2019 films
Indian romantic comedy films
2019 directorial debut films
2019 romantic comedy films